Nicole Brown is a film executive, producer, and president of TriStar Pictures.

Early life and education 
Brown was raised in Los Angeles. She graduated from Columbia University.

Career 
Brown is the former executive vice president at Good Universe. She was named president of Sony Pictures Entertainment's TriStar Pictures in October 2020.

References 

American film studio executives
American film producers
Columbia University alumni